Jacqueline Ellen Last (born 31 January 1975), better known as Jackie O, is an Australian radio and television presenter. She is best known for presenting The Hot Hits Live from LA, Hot30 Countdown, Take 40 Australia, two series of Australian Princess, and The Kyle and Jackie O Show (with co-host Kyle Sandilands).

She has also hosted celebrity prank show Surprise Surprise Gotcha and appeared on the 2007 comedy series The Nation on the Nine Network. She also was the co-host of Big Brother (alongside Kyle Sandilands) after Gretel Killeen, the original host, resigned from the series.

On 1 November 2013, Jackie and co-host Kyle Sandilands announced they would not be returning in 2014 to host their 2Day FM breakfast show, which at that time was generating around 30 million AUD in advertising revenue yearly. On 29 November 2013, Kyle and Jackie O announced their move to rival radio network ARN and show on new 106.5 station, coming in 2014 with a nightly "Best Bits" program networked around ARN stations Australia-wide.

In 2018, Jackie O recorded a song titled "Honey Money" after being dared by Sandilands; it later reached number one on the Australian iTunes chart, with all proceeds being donated to Australian farmers affected by drought.

Biography

Radio
Jackie O originally had no intentions to become a radio personality until meeting Phil O'Neil while he was the night host at the Gold Coast's Sea FM in early 1993. At the time, she had worked as an office girl and sandwich hand at a delicatessen. She moved to Canberra with O'Neil a few months later, after he accepted an offer to join FM104.7. After initial rejections by management to have her as his 'phone girl', they finally agreed, although no remuneration was offered.

Soon after, O'Neil accepted an offer to join Triple M Adelaide but only on condition that Jackie was to be his co-host and it was at this time that she adopted the stage name "Jackie O". When the next survey result came out, the duo's ratings had doubled, easily beating their main rivals SAFM in the same time slot. After another ratings rise in the following survey, Phil and Jackie were snapped up by Fox FM in Melbourne. Soon after, their show was networked (Hot 30) after their move to 2Day FM in Sydney. 

The duo co-hosted a Network Ten music show called Ground Zero and the Hot 30 radio show during the late 1990s until the couple divorced and O'Neil relocated to the United Kingdom. Henderson's career on radio rose to new heights after she was partnered with "shock jock" Kyle Sandilands on the Today Network (broadcasting from Sydney station 2Day FM). The pair moved from drive time to breakfast at the beginning of 2005. They continued to host the countdown show The Hot Hits until August 2009.

In addition to radio, TV and advertising appearances, Henderson has also done voice-over work for the animated movie Robots, voicing the character "Loretta Geargrinder" in the Australian release.

In August 2013, Kyle and Jackie O announced that they would be moving from 2Day FM to KIIS 106.5FM. By March 2014 they had more than doubled the number of breakfast listeners at KiiS FM, with their show being the most popular FM show in Sydney with 532,000 listeners, while 2Day FM lost 242,000 listeners during the move.

In 2018, Sandilands dared Jackie O to write and record a song in one day; the result, "Honey Money", written by Avalonia and produced by KIIS FM producer Kian Oliver (who also provided a rap), went to number one on the Australian iTunes chart (#13 on the ARIA Digital Sales chart, spending one week within the Top 50), with all proceeds being donated to Drought Angels, a charity set up to help drought-affected Australian farmers. The song was later removed due to a copyright infringement issue with the artwork, as Jackie O's face had been hastily Photoshopped onto that of Iggy Azalea's. Jackie O announced her intention to reupload the song for free.

Television
Jackie O has hosted a variety of television shows, most prominently the Popstars series, in which televised auditions were held to select members of a vocal group. In 2005, Jackie O also hosted the Network Ten reality show, Australian Princess, in which they transformed a group of women to sophisticated "princesses". A second series of Australian Princess had gone to air during the non-ratings summer period on Network 10 starting in December. No reason was given by the Network as to why it was shown out of the official ratings period.

In June 2007, she was a cast member of The Nation airing on the Nine Network. She was also co-host of the comedy show Surprise Surprise Gotcha on the same network, the series has been called the Australian version of Punk'd which was made famous by pranking many celebrities. In October 2007, she along with her radio partner Kyle Sandilands would take Gretel Killeen's job in hosting the 2008 series of Big Brother Australia. Killeen hosted the show from its start in 2001 to 2007. Following poor ratings for this 2008 series, Network Ten announced on 14 July 2008 that Big Brother Australia would not return in 2009.

In 2019, it was announced that Jackie O would be one of the guessers on The Masked Singer Australia alongside Dannii Minogue, Dave Hughes and Lindsay Lohan. However, after the third season, she announced that she will be departing the show in order to spend more time with her daughter. She was replaced by fellow radio host Abbie Chatfield.

Personal life
She was married to her co-host Phil O'Neil during their combined radio career. After their divorce, O'Neil moved to the United Kingdom in the late 1990s. In 2003, she married UK photographer Lee Henderson. The couple announced their separation in October 2018.

She is an animal rights activist.
In 2009, Jackie O was named as the second most hated celebrity in an annual list by Zoo Magazine (only surpassed by co-host Kyle Sandilands at number one).

Discography
Singles
 "Honey Money" featuring Kian Oliver (2018)

References

External links
 
 Radio bottom feeders need intervention The Daily Telegraph – Michelle Cazzulino (30 July 2009)
 Fun – Kyle and Jackie O Style ABC 'Media Watch' (3 August 2009)
 

Big Brother (Australian TV series)
1975 births
Living people
Rock Eisteddfod Challenge participants
Australian television actresses
People from Adelaide
Australian music critics
Australian women music critics
Australian music journalists
Australian women journalists
Australian radio presenters
Australian women radio presenters
Australian women television presenters
Australian game show hosts